Our Lady of Lourdes Metropolitan Cathedral, one of the largest churches in Kerala, is located in the heart of Thrissur City in the  state of Kerala, India. Dedicated to Our Lady of Lourdes, the Syro-Malabar Catholic church is noted for its imposing interior. The main attraction is an underground shrine, considered a masterpiece of architectural design. Fr John Maliekkal is said to have planned and constructed this church. The exterior of the church features an Indo-European facade with white spires.  The centenary of this church was celebrated during the historic visit of Pope John Paul II to Thrissur City in 1986. The cathedral church attracts thousands of pilgrims every month.

Landmarks
1875: A new Syrian Catholic Church was founded in Thrissur; the Marth-Mariyam Valiyapalli erected in 1814 was occupied by Chaldean Syrian Schismatics under Mar Elias Mellus Archbishop (For this and following material.) 
1885: Establishment of our Lady of Lourdes Church for the Latin Catholics ( Roman Catholics of Latin Rite ). 
1887: Erection of the vicariate Apostolic of Trichur (20 May) with Mgr. Adolphus Medlycott as the first Vicar Apostolic.
1891: Elevation of the Lourdes Church as the Cathedral of the Vicariate of Trichur in exchange for the 1875 Roman  Syrian Church for  Latin Catholics.
1896: Elevation of Mgr. John Menachery (Cathedral Vicar) to the Status of Vicar Apostolic.
1923: Elevation of Trichur as Diocese, with Mar Francis Vazhappilly as the first Bishop. Restoration of Indian Syro-Malabar Catholic Hierarchy

1934: Blessing of the chapel near main gate.
1952: Blessing of the chapel in the crypt 75’x 50’
1957: Blessing of the present cathedral by Mar George Alappatt.
1986: Episcopal consecration of the statue of Our Lady of Lourdes. A solemn conclusion of centenary celebration of the diocese and of its cathedral by Pope John Paul II during His Apostolic Visit to Thrissur 7 February
1995: Elevation of Trichur as a Metropolitan See, and Lourdes Church as the Metropolitan Cathedral
1996: Blessing of the Centenary Hall
1997: Installation of Mar Jacob Thoomkuzhy Metropolitan Archbishop of Trichur
1998: Blessing of Cemetery Chapel.
2004: Episcopal ordination of Mar Andrews Thazhath, the Third Archbishop of Trichur.
2010: Episcopal ordination of Mar Raphael Thattil, the second Auxiliary Bishop of Trichur
2017: Episcopal ordination of Mar Tony Neelankavil, the third Auxiliary Bishop of Trichur

Gallery

See also
Roman Catholicism in India
Christianity in India

References

Churches in Thrissur
Basilica churches in India
Eastern Catholic cathedrals in Kerala
Syro-Malabar Catholic church buildings
1885 establishments in British India
Tourist attractions in Thrissur
British colonial architecture in India
Syro-Malabar Catholic cathedrals
Churches completed in 1957